The Mercedes-Benz F800 Style is a concept car made by the German brand Mercedes-Benz and first shown at the 2010 Geneva Motor Show. It was a preview to the second generation Mercedes-Benz CLS.

Overview
The F800 Style is a 5-seat executive saloon that is powered by efficient drive technologies and expresses the new design language of Mercedes-Benz that would influence several aspects of the brand's subsequent production models. It features a multi drive platform, which is suited for electric drives with fuel cells as well as the use of plug-in hybrids. Long wheelbase, short body overhangs, a coupe-like roof line and the rear sliding doors are the main features of the F800 Style research vehicle. The front of the car is very similar to the SLS AMG model.

Engine and Drivetrain
F800 Style Plug-in Hybrid

The F800 Style has a drive range of  solely on electric power thanks to the lithium-ion battery with a storage capacity of >10 kWh. The battery can be recharged either at a charging station or a household power socket.

F800 Style F-CELL

The F800 Style can also be driven using an electric drive based on fuel cell technology. The use of the fuel cell technology gives the car a range of almost , with 5.2 kilograms of hydrogen.

See also
 Mercedes-Benz F700

References

F800
Cars introduced in 2009
Executive cars
Sedans